Blackass is a novel by Nigerian author A. Igoni Barrett. It was released in the United Kingdom and Nigeria in 2015, and 2016 in the United States. It received mixed reviews.

Plot summary
The novel concerns Furo Wariboko, a Nigerian man, who wakes up one day to discover that he has become white.

Reception
The Financial Times called Blackass "strange (and) compelling, (...with) something to tell us all", and explicitly compared it to Kafka's The Metamorphosis. Writing in The Guardian, Helon Habila lauded Barrett for "his ability to satirise the ridiculous extents people, especially Lagosians, go to in order to appear important." Claire Fallon for the Huffington Post found it to be "blunt (and) transparently written", but also "subtle (and) circumspect." Aaron Bady of Okayafrica stated that it is "the most unapologetically Nigerian book that American publishers have published in a long time".

In 2016 Blackass won the People's Literature Publishing House and the Chinese Foreign Literature Society's 21st Century Best Foreign Novel Award. It was nominated for the inaugural FT/OppenheimerFunds Emerging Voices Awards, the 2017 PEN Open Book Award, the 2015 Kitschies Golden Tentacle Award, and the inaugural Nommo Award for Best Novel. In 2017 it was nominated for a Hurston/Wright Legacy Award in the debut fiction category.

References

2015 Nigerian novels
2015 debut novels
Novels set in Lagos
Nigerian fantasy novels
Chatto & Windus books